John Francis King (9 April 1919 – 21 July 2012) was an Australian rules footballer who played with Hawthorn in the Victorian Football League (VFL).

Notes

External links 

1919 births
2012 deaths
Australian rules footballers from Melbourne
Hawthorn Football Club players
People from Oakleigh, Victoria